Buena Vista Railroad may refer to:
Buena Vista Railroad (Georgia), 1880–1885, predecessor of the Central of Georgia Railway
Buena Vista Railroad (New Jersey), 1889–1917, predecessor of the Central Railroad of New Jersey